The 2014–15 American Athletic Conference men's basketball season took place between November 2014 and March 2015. Practices began in October 2014, with conference play beginning in December, and the season ended with the 2015 American Athletic Conference men's basketball tournament. The season was the second since the split of the original Big East Conference into two separate leagues.

This was the first season for East Carolina, Tulane, and Tulsa in American Athletic competition.

Preseason

Coaching changes
Tulsa Hired Frank Haith, after Former Coach Danny Manning took the Wake Forest job
Kelvin Sampson was hired at Houston after former coach James Dickey resigned for Personal reasons
Orlando Antigua was hired at USF, after USF rescinded their offer to Steve Masiello after it was reported that he had not graduated from the University of Kentucky, as his resume had stated.  Masiello was originally hired to replace Stan Heath, who was fired

Predicted American Athletic results
At American Athletic Conference media day on October 29, the conference released their predictions for standings and All-Conference teams.

() first place votes

Preseason All-AAC Teams

American Athletic Preseason Player of the Year: Ryan Boatright, Connecticut
American Athletic Preseason Rookie of the Year: Daniel Hamilton, Connecticut

Preseason Watchlists

Rankings

AAC regular season
This table summarizes the head-to-head results between teams in conference play.

Postseason

  March 12–15, 2015 at the XL Center in Hartford, CT

NCAA tournament

National Invitation tournament

Awards and honors

Conference awards and teams 
All Conference and All Rookie teams were announced on March 10, Defensive Player of the Year, Sixth Man Award, Most Improved Player, and Sportsmanship Award were announced on March 11. Player of the Year and Coach of the year were announced on March 12

References